Cuto is a town in southern Angola.

Transport 

It is near a deviation of the southern line of the national railway network.

See also 

 Railway stations in Angola

References 

Populated places in Angola